This is a comprehensive list of rolling stock of the Isle of Wight Steam Railway at Havenstreet, Isle of Wight.

Steam locomotives
Havenstreet currently boasts a surplus of ex. Wight railway network stalwarts & industrial tank engine designs. More are being restored all the time, covering for other locomotives as they themselves are taken out of service. In the near future, additional classes from the mainland may be brought in for when the railway expands its operations.

Diesel locomotives
Three diesel shunters are currently in the custody of the railway, all of which have run a majority of service trains, as opposed to the usual steam-hauled passenger services.

Operational

Undergoing overhaul, restoration or repairs

Stored or static

Multiple Units

Undergoing overhaul, restoration or repairs

The Ryde Pier Petrol Tram was built in 1927 by Drewry. It was withdrawn in 1969 when the tramway closed. It is undergoing restoration work, with a possibility of running the tram on the IOWSR in the future.

Stored or Static

The British Rail Class 483 483007, named "Jess Harper," was transferred from the Island Line to the Isle of Wight Steam Railway in 2021 for static display in the carriage shed at Havenstreet Station. The train was originally built in 1940 as London Underground 1938 Stock. A medium-term goal of the Steam Railway is to have 483007 operate on the line, either by having propulsion provided by one of the diesel shunters, or by being converted to battery power.

The Ryde Pier Electric Tram was built by Merres Pollard and Sons in 1911. It was withdrawn in 1927 and replaced by a petrol tram. In 1980, it was brought for a price of £2 by a private owner and was given to the Isle of Wight Council who cosmetic restored it. It went to the Cothy Bottom Heritage Center, Newport Quary and the Isle of Wight Bus Museum before being put away out of the public view. In 2018, ownership was transferred to the Isle of Wight Steam Railway (IOWSR).

Coaching stock
All of the railway's operational coaches have been built to a pre-grouping design. These have been restored by the skilled Havenstreet staff and are the envy of many Southern Region preserved railways.

IWR coaches
The stock collection includes a small set of original Isle of Wight Railway passenger stock.

LB&SCR coaches
The stock collection currently has six coaches of the former LB&SCR, the earliest built in 1896.

LC&DR coaches
The London, Chatham and Dover Railway's role in the south of England ensured an ample collection of stock for the owning groups.

SE&CR coaches
An amalgamation of LC&DR and SER, the South Eastern and Chatham Railway also contributed to the Island Line's working stock.

MSJ&AR coaches

NLR coaches

Coach under-frames
The Railway uses various under-frames from donor vehicles to place coach bodies on top.

Southern Railway Vans
The Railway has complete SR Vans stored ready to be used as donor vehicles, or are currently operational on the railway.

Goods wagons

Brake vans

Covered goods vans

Open goods wagons

Flat wagons, bolster wagons and Rail and Sleeper wagons

Tank wagons

Ballast wagons

Cranes and other special use wagons

References

Isle of Wight Steam Railway
Rail transport on the Isle of Wight
Tourist attractions on the Isle of Wight
Steam Railway locomotives and rolling stock
Isle of Wight Steam Railway
Preserved steam locomotives by country